Sligo is-

History
A post office called Sligo was established in 1844, and remained in operation until 1865. The community was named after the Sligo Iron Works in Pittsburgh, a favorite brand of 19th-century blacksmiths.

Gallery

References

Clinton County, Ohio